William Peterson was Dean of Carlisle between 1626 and 1629;
and of Exeter between 1629 and 1661.

Notes

Deans of Exeter
Year of birth missing
Year of death missing